Matthew T. Abruzzo (April 30, 1889 – May 28, 1971) was a United States district judge of the United States District Court for the Eastern District of New York. He was the first Italian American to be appointed as a federal judge.

Education and career

Born in Brooklyn, New York, Abruzzo received a Bachelor of Laws from Brooklyn Law School in 1910, and was in private practice in Brooklyn from then until 1936.

Federal judicial service

Abruzzo was nominated by President Franklin D. Roosevelt on February 3, 1936, to the United States District Court for the Eastern District of New York, to a new seat authorized by 49 Stat. 659. He was confirmed by the United States Senate on February 12, 1936, and received his commission on February 15, 1936. He assumed senior status on February 15, 1966. His service terminated on May 28, 1971, due to his death in Potomac, Maryland.

References

Sources
 

1889 births
1971 deaths
20th-century American judges
Brooklyn Law School alumni
Judges of the United States District Court for the Eastern District of New York
Lawyers from Brooklyn
New York (state) lawyers
United States district court judges appointed by Franklin D. Roosevelt